Cracked After Hours was a comedy web series hosted on the website Cracked.com (and simultaneously on YouTube) and produced by Cracked and its then-parent company The E. W. Scripps Company.

Overview 
The scripted comedy followed four friends/co-workers of Cracked.com who meet after work at their local diner.  The Seinfeldian conversations usually result in heavily disputed opinions about pop culture and life in general.

The series was launched on July 19, 2010 with an episode centered around the 1985 film Back to the Future, and grew to become the most viewed web series on Cracked.com. The show's first 13 episodes had reached 15 million views by April 2012  and it subsequently expanded to 30 episodes and surpassed 25 million total views. It starred Cracked.com employees Michael Swaim, Daniel O'Brien, and Soren Bowie and regular Cracked contributor Katie Willert. Most episodes were written by one of the stars or series co-creator Jack O'Brien, with help from the Cracked team.

The series integrated animated segments created by artists Winston Rowntree, Brett Herholz, Anthony Clark, and Matt Barrs. Characters' thoughts are illustrated by thought-bubbles or full-screen display. The first 22 episodes were directed by Justin Viar. Subsequent episodes were been directed by Abe Epperson, Adam Ganser or various others.

In 2013 After Hours was nominated for a Webby Award.

Introduction of second cast (2017)
The July 24, 2017 episode "Awkward Scenes That Must Have Happened In Marvel Movies" introduced a second cast of diner patrons: Yazmin Monet Watkins, Kimia Behpoornia, Cracked writer Carmen Angelica and Cracked head writer for video Cody Johnston. This group meets at the same diner, and has similar pop culture conversations. Before its cancellation, episodes of this second cast were to be released monthly, alongside new episodes from the original cast.

Cancellation
Prior to December 4, 2017, Soren Bowie had left Cracked to pursue another writing job while Michael Swaim had quit in October to pursue other media.  On December 4, 2017, Cracked laid off a significant number of staff members, including Daniel O'Brien, Carmen Angelica, and Cody Johnston.  Before this, an episode had been filmed which would be the final one to feature the original cast, allowing the show to continue with the new cast. In the wake of the layoffs, this episode was never aired. The last episode uploaded to the Cracked YouTube channel was "The Best Movie Hell to End Up In" on November 20, 2017.

After After Hours
On April 9, 2019, via the Small Beans Patreon, Michael Swaim announced that he and several other of his Cracked alumni would be raising money to create a new version of After Hours away from Cracked.com. In the update, Swaim stated that the new show Off Hours would focus on four friends who 'discuss pop culture in their spare time, accompanied by fanciful illustrations and masterfully-edited clip packages'. He went on to say that everybody working on it had a prior association with After Hours and that episodes would be directed by Abe Epperson (the director of many After Hours episodes) with a revolving cast including Swaim, Cody Johnston, Katy Stoll, Greg Burke, Damien Washington, Maggie Mae Fish, Teresa Lee and Daniel Vincent Gordh.

On May 10, 2019, Michael Swaim tweeted a logo for the new show designed by Small Beans artist Michael Bramley and added; 'It's real now, you guys. There are art assets. This is really happening.' 

On July 12, 2020, the original cast met for a charity stream, doing a table read for the intended series finale for the original cast. The episode saw the group discuss "What TV Friend Group would be the best to join" - as it's revealed that the foursome is about to go their own ways. The stream ended up raising $11,000 for the CDC Foundation.

On May 28, 2021, the original cast released another series finale on the Small Beans channel, titled "The After Hours Quarantine Special."

Episodes

Season 1: 2010–2011

Season 2: 2012

Season 3: 2013

Season 4: 2014

Season 5: 2015

Season 6: 2016

Season 7: 2017

References

External links 

 Cracked After Hours
 TV Tropes: Web Video / After Hours

American comedy web series
Web talk shows
2010 web series debuts
2017 web series endings
2010s YouTube series